Ghiglione is an Italian surname. Notable people with the surname include:

Loren Ghiglione (born 1941), American journalist, editor, and educator
Paolo Ghiglione (born 1997), Italian footballer
Romualdo Ghiglione (1891–1940), Italian gymnast

Italian-language surnames